Welcome to the Heartbreak Hotel is the second album by C. C. Catch. Like the debut album, it was a success and nearly all tracks from the album are well known, although the album artwork and the videoclip for the song "Heaven and Hell" are reminiscent of the 1981 horror film The Beyond by Lucio Fulci.

Track listing 
Heartbreak Hotel — 3:33
Picture Blue Eyes — 3:30
Tears Won't Wash Away My Heartache — 4:19
V.I.P (They're Callin' Me Tonight) — 3:27
You Can't Run Away From It — 3:12
Heaven and Hell — 3:39
Hollywood Nights — 3:10
Born on the Wind — 3:50
Wild Fire — 3:40
Stop – Draggin' My Heart Around — 3:07

Credits
Art Direction – M. Vormstein 
Co-producer – Luis Rodriguez 
Design – Ariola-Studios 
Music By, Lyrics By, Producer, Arranged By – Dieter Bohlen 
Photography [Coverphoto] – Mauritius/NAS Tom McHugh-OKAPA 
Photography By [Artist Photo] – H. W. Hesselmann

Notes
Catalog# on the labels and spine: 208 064
Catalog# on the back cover: 208 064-630

Charts

References

C. C. Catch albums
1986 albums